Einsatzflottille 1 (EinsFltl 1 or EF 1) is one of the three brigade-level units of the German Navy, in addition to Einsatzflottille 2 and the Naval Air Command. It is based in Kiel, Schleswig-Holstein, and is under the head of the Navy Command, based in Rostock.

History

Einsatzflottille 1 was set up on 29 June 2006 as part of a major reorganization of the fleet. This brought all fast attack craft, mine warfare ships, and submarines of the German Navy under one organisational umbrella. The five corvettes of the Braunschweig class were integrated into the flotilla from 2008 onward. In 2012 the EF 1 was stationed in the Baltic Sea. On 16 November 2016 the 7. Schnellbootgeschwader in Warnemünde was also decommissioned.

Subordinate units

1st Corvette Squadron 
The 1. Korvettengeschwader was created on 29th June 2006 with the commissioning of the first Braunschweig-class corvettes and is stationed at Hohe Düne Naval Base near Rostock-Warnemünde. Five additional corvettes built to the same (slightly modernised) design were ordered in 2017 and are planned to be commissioned from 2022 on, beginning with F265 Köln.

 Braunschweig-class (130) corvette
 F260 Braunschweig
 F261 Magdeburg
 F262 Oldenburg
 F263 Erfurt
 F264 Ludwigshafen am Rhein

3rd Mine Countermeasures Squadron 
3. Minensuchgeschwader was raised on 15th October 1956 as 3rd Fast (schnelles) Mine Countermeasures Squadron in Wilhelmshaven and moved to Kiel from 1st August 1958 on. The squadron received its current name in February 1960. On 23rd September 1992, the squadron was temporarily disbanded but reinstituted on 2nd April 1996 in Olpenitz (today part of Kappeln). About a decade later, Olpenitz naval base was dissolved and the squadron returned to Kiel on 1st February 2006. 

With the 1st and 5th mine countermeasures squadrons having been disbanded, the 3rd squadron now unites all mine warfare vessels of the German Navy.

 Frankenthal-class (332) minehunter
 M1058 Fulda
 M1059 Weilheim
 M1061 Rottweil (fitted as diver support vessel)
 M1062 Sulzbach-Rosenberg
 M1063 Bad Bevensen
 M1064 Grömitz
 M1065 Dillingen
 M1067 Bad Rappenau (fitted as diver support vessel)
 M1068 Datteln
 M1069 Homburg
 Ensdorf-class (352) minesweeper (mostly used for recruitment and training)
 M 1090 Pegnitz
 M 1098 Siegburg

Support Squadron 
The Unterstützungsgeschwader commands five of the six Elbe-class tenders and is stationed in Kiel.

 Elbe-class (404) tender
 A511 Elbe in Warnemünde
 A512 Mosel in Kiel
 A513 Rhein in Kiel
 A514 Werra in Kiel
 A516 Donau in Kiel

1st Submarine Squadron 
1. Ubootgeschwader and its units are stationed in Eckernförde where the squadron was created on 1st October 1961. It was part of the Ubootflotille (Submarine Flotilla) which was stationed in Eckernförde and also commanded the 1st squadrons sister unit, 3. Ubootgeschwader. Both units were dissolved in 2006, with the remaining submarines being transferred to 1st squadron.

 U-31-class (212 A) submarine
 S182 U-31
 S182 U-32
 S183 U-33
 S184 U-34
 S185 U-35
 S186 U-36
 Oste-class (423) fleet service ship
 A50 Alster
 A52 Oste
 A53 Oker 
 Elbe-class (404) tender
 A515 Main (fitted for submarine tending)

  Submarine Training Centre

Sea Battalion

Navy Special Forces Command

Naval Base Commands 
 Naval Base Command Kiel
Naval Base Command Eckernförde
Naval Base Command Warnemünde

The commander of EF 1 also functions as director of the NATO-led Centre of Excellence for Operations in Confined and Shallow Waters, COE CSW.

Commanders

References

Military units and formations of the German Navy
Kiel
2006 establishments in Germany